Eleni Nastouli  (born Ελένη Ναστούλη, Greece) is a Greek clinical virologist who works at University College London Hospitals NHS Foundation Trust (UCLH) and Great Ormond Street Hospital. At UCLH, Nastouli leads the Advanced Pathogen Diagnostics Unit, where she develops technologies for genome sequencing as well as studying how viruses are transmitted around hospitals. During the COVID-19 pandemic Nastouli led an investigation into infection rates amongst healthcare workers.

Early life and education 

Nastouli is from Greece. She studied medicine at the National and Kapodistrian University of Athens. She moved to the United Kingdom, where she specialised in paediatrics in Manchester.

Research and career 
After completing her training at the University of Manchester, Nastouli joined Imperial College London, where she trained in clinical virology. She moved to University College London in 2009. At University College London Nastouli leads the Advanced Pathogen Diagnostics Unit as well as the antenatal infectious diseases clinic. She looks to support pregnant women with viral infectious diseases, including Zika ad Hepatitis B. She has investigated novel strategies to test for and treat HIV, Zika and Middle East respiratory syndrome (MERS). Nastouli is the virology consultant at Great Ormond Street Hospital.

In her capacity as lead of the Advanced Pathogen Diagnostics Unit, Nastouli uses information from genome sequencing to improve patient outcomes. Nastouli was made clinical lead for InfeCtion respONse through vIrus genomiCs (ICONIC), a programme that developed a mechanism to sequence the genome of viral pathogens as part of routine National Health Service services. ICONIC made us of next-generation sequencing in combination with electronic health records to allow physicians and policy makers to visualise outbreaks. The electronic health records provide information about a patients journey through hospital, which makes it possible to contact-trace people who are infected with a virus. It was used to control a hospital outbreak of influenza. In 2018 ICONIC was awarded the Institution of Engineering and Technology (IET) Healthcare Technology award.

Alongside her role in ICONIC, Nastouli is a member of i-sense, a consortium that looks to identify and prevent outbreaks of infectious diseases. The consortium will support communities in low and middle-income countries, where early detection and diagnosis can transform patient outcomes. i-Sense makes use of a simple diagnostic tool that is connected to mobile phones, sending information wirelessly to healthcare systems. By mapping indicators of emerging infections, i-sense will help global public health efforts.

During the COVID-19 pandemic Nastoulli was awarded funding from the UK Research and Innovation (UKRI) to study infection rates amongst healthcare workers at UCLH. Her programme, Evaluation to Inform Response Study (SAFER), will involve frequent testing as well as monitoring of healthcare worker behavior. She hopes that SAFER will help to mitigate the coronavirus outbreak, as well as inform future pandemic management strategies. Nastouli is also contributing to Virus Watch, a project led by Andrew Hayward that will investigate the spread of coronavirus disease around the United Kingdom as well as analysing how social distancing impacts infection rates.

Selected publications

Awards and honours
Nastouli is a Fellow of the Royal College of Paediatrics and Child Health (FRCPCH) and a Fellow of the Royal College of Pathologists (FRCPath).

References

Living people
Year of birth missing (living people)
Greek women physicians
Academics of University College London
National and Kapodistrian University of Athens alumni
Academics of Imperial College London
Women virologists
Greek virologists